Concetta "Connie" Wagner (born July 7, 1948) is an American Democratic Party politician, who had served in the New Jersey General Assembly since January 8, 2008, where she had represented the 38th legislative district until her resignation on October 1, 2013.

Wagner received a B.A. from Trenton State College (now The College of New Jersey) with a major in Education, and was awarded an M.A. from Montclair State University in Student Affairs.

Wagner served on the Bergen County Board of Chosen Freeholders in 2007, and was a member of the Paramus Borough Council from 2002-2007.  Before she was elected Assemblywoman, Wagner worked as a high school guidance counselor at Paramus High School.

General Assembly
Wagner was selected by a special meeting of the Bergen County Democratic Organization in September 2007 to fill a vacancy on the Democratic ballot for Assembly when Bob Gordon became a State Senator from District 38 to replace the retiring Joseph Coniglio.  At the time Wagner was serving as both a county freeholder and borough councilwoman.  She stepped down from both posts when she took her Assembly seat and served with Joan Voss as District 38's Assembly members.

Wagner ran for re-election twice and was returned to office both times. She served during the 2012-2013 Legislative term with Tim Eustace, who was elected to replace Voss after she decided to run for a Freeholder seat.

In the Assembly, Wagner served on the Joint Committee on the Public Schools (as Co-Chair), on the Labor Committee (as Vice-Chair), Higher Education Committee and the Education.

Wagner had announced that she was not going to run for re-election in 2013 and decided to step down from her seat effective October 1, 2013, so that she could have the opportunity to spend more time with her family in Florida. Paramus Council President Joseph Lagana had already been given Wagner's ballot position in the 38th District for the November general election but announced that he planned to complete his term on the Borough Council and would not take the seat on an interim basis. The Bergen County Democratic Organization conducted a special convention to consider potential candidates to fill the position on an interim basis.

References

External links
Connie Wagner legislative website, New Jersey Legislature
New Jersey Legislature financial disclosure forms
2012 2011 2010 2009 2008 2007
Assembly Member Concetta Wagner, Project Vote Smart
Assembly Majority Web site

1948 births
Living people
Montclair State University alumni
New Jersey city council members
County commissioners in New Jersey
Democratic Party members of the New Jersey General Assembly
People from Paramus, New Jersey
Politicians from Bergen County, New Jersey
The College of New Jersey alumni
Women state legislators in New Jersey
Women city councillors in New Jersey
21st-century American politicians
21st-century American women politicians